Tony Le (born 26 August 1999) is a Czech-Vietnamese footballer who plays as a midfielder for Pho Hien. He was born in Benešov to Vietnamese parents.

Career
Tony Le started his career with Bohemians 1905 B in the Czech third division.

Before the second half of 2019/20, he was sent on loan to the youth academy of Czech second division side Vlašim.

Before the 2021 season, Tony Le was sent on loan to Binh Dinh in Vietnam.

References

External links

Tony Lê Tuấn Anh at Bohemians Praha 1905

Czech people of Vietnamese descent
Czech footballers
V.League 1 players
Expatriate footballers in Vietnam
Czech expatriate footballers
1999 births
Living people
Binh Dinh FC players
Association football midfielders
People from Benešov
Vietnamese footballers
Sportspeople of Vietnamese descent
Sportspeople from the Central Bohemian Region